Party Music is the fourth studio album by American hip hop group The Coup. It was originally released on 75 Ark on November 6, 2001. It was re-released on Epitaph Records in 2004.

Album cover controversy
The original cover of the album, created in June 2001 depicted Boots Riley and Pam the Funkstress destroying the twin towers of the World Trade Center using what appeared to be a detonator. The apparent detonator was actually an electronic tuner. The album was originally scheduled for release in September of that year, but after the September 11 attacks, the band decided to postpone the album’s release until November, so they could create new cover art.

In a 2001 interview with Seattle newspaper The Stranger, Boots Riley spoke about his fight to keep the album cover following the events of September 11:

Critical reception
At Metacritic, which assigns a weighted average score out of 100 to reviews from mainstream critics, the album received an average score of 85 based on 11 reviews, indicating "universal acclaim".

Spin included it on the "20 Best Albums of 2001" list.

Track listing

Personnel
Credits adapted from liner notes.

The Coup
 Boots Riley – vocals, claps, snaps, claves, synthesizer, drum programming, production, recording
 Pam the Funkstress – turntables

Additional musicians
 Mike Tiger – synthesizer (1, 2, 4, 6, 7, 8, 11), clavinet (3, 7, 8, 11), piano (4, 6, 8, 10, 12), keyboard bass (9, 12), organ (12)
 David James – guitar (1, 4, 7, 8, 9, 10, 12)
 Martin Luther – vocals (2, 3, 5, 11)
 Elijah Hassan – bass guitar (2, 4, 7, 10)
 Guy Hubbard – whistle (3)
 Keith McArthur – bass guitar (3, 8)
 T-Kash – vocals (4, 9)
 Alisha Calhoun – violin (4)
 M1 – vocals (5)
 Stick – vocals (5)
 Tahir – keyboards (5), drum programming (5), production (5)
 Lenon Honor – vocals (6, 12)
 Funkyman – vocals (6, 7)
 Keneice – vocals (8, 10)
 Josh Jones – congas (10), bells (10)

Technical personnel
 Bob Brown – recording
 Matt Kelley – recording, mixing
 Tony Dawsey – mastering
 Victor Hall – cover image
 Brandon Arnovick – package design

References

External links
 

2001 albums
The Coup albums
75 Ark albums
Epitaph Records albums